The 2000–01 Ukrainian Cup  was the tenth annual edition of Ukraine's football knockout competition, known as the Ukrainian Cup. The winner of this competition was Shakhtar Donetsk, beating CSKA Kyiv in the final.

Round and draw dates
All draws held at FFU headquarters (Building of Football) in Kyiv unless stated otherwise.

Competition schedule

First round 
First three games took place on September 16, 2000 (Oleksandriya, Sumy, Zolochiv), while most of the games took place on September 17. Also the game in Chernivstsi was conducted on September 18 and in Zhytomyr – on September 19.

Notes:

Second round 
All games took place on September 23, 2000.

Quarterfinals 
All games took place on November 2, 2000.

Notes:

Semifinals 
All games took place on April 11, 2001.

Notes:

Final

See also
 2000–01 Ukrainian Second League Cup

Ukrainian Cup seasons
Cup
Ukrainian Cup